The Bowman Mill Covered Bridge, in Perry County, Ohio, is a multiple kingpost truss covered bridge which was built in 1880.  It was listed on the National Register of Historic Places in 1978.

It was a work of Lank Bowman.  It has also been termed the Rush Creek Covered Bridge and the Readington Covered Bridge.

It was located south of New Reading, on Winegardner Rd.

It was moved to the fairgrounds in 1987

References

Covered bridges in Ohio
National Register of Historic Places in Perry County, Ohio
Bridges completed in 1880